Association des Amis de l'Art Rupestre Saharien (Association of the Friends of Saharan Rock Art) is a French scientific organisation focusing on the rock art of the Sahara. It was established in 1991.

The organisation publishes two journals:
 La Lettre de l'AARS (semi-annual) 
 Cahiers de l'AARS (annual)  

The AARS is a member of the International Federation of Rock Art Organizations.

References

External links 
 
 02.05.2008 L'art rupestre saharien à La Chaux-de-Fonds, RTN (Switzerland)

Saharan rock art